Bjørn Kjellemyr (born 4 December 1950 in Bamble, Norway) is a jazz double bassist, known from a variety of musical contexts like Terje Rypdal & The Chasers, Joe Henderson, Bob Berg, Chet Baker, Art Farmer, Pat Metheny, Mike Stern, Dag Arnesen, Knut Riisnæs, Jon Eberson, Bugge Wesseltoft, Audun Kleive, Jon Balke, Jan Gunnar Hoff and Ketil Bjørnstad.

Career 
Kjellemyr played bass in local rock bands in the Skien area, while he explored the jazz with pianist Rune Klakegg and joined in Guttorm Guttormsen's Big band and Quartet, with performances at the Norwegian Jazz Association's anniversary concerts in 1973 and Moldejazz Festival 1974. He moved to Oslo and studied at Norges Musikkhøgskole (1974–78).

Kjellemyr lived in Bergen from 1978–80 and was employed at Musikkselskabet Philharmonic Orchestra, and was part of Dag Arnesen Trio and Sextet 1978-79, Søbstad/Arnesen Quartet 1979-80, and appeared at different festivals with such as Jon Balke, Jon Eberson and Erling Aksdal, and has actually performed at every «Moldejazz» since 1974.

He has participated in a number of different jazz groups including with Knut Riisnæs, Jon Eberson, Bugge Wesseltoft, Audun Kleive, Jon Balke, Jan Gunnar Hoff, Ketil Bjørnstad, and is particularly known for his long collaboration with guitarist Terje Rypdal. Kjellemyr has played with a series of international jazz greats like Joe Henderson, Bob Berg, Chet Baker, Art Farmer, Pat Metheny and Mike Stern. The bassist has contributed on a large number of recordings, among others on the ECM label. He has also played with singers/songwriters Kari Bremnes, Jan Eggum, Anne Grete Preus and Karoline Krüger.

Kjellemyr received the "Jazz Musician of the Year" (1990) and "Buddy Prize" (1994). He is employed at the 2005 Norges Musikkhøgskole as Associate Professor at the department of jazz and improvised music.

With the orchestra Metropolitan he released two albums, Metropolitan (1999) and Love Is Blind (2004). "Metropolitan" is Beate S. Lech, Jon Eberson, Morten Halle, Pål Thowsen and Rob Waring in addition to Kjellemyr.
He is an improviser who is comfortable with different musical environments basis. From 1998 he appeared in concerts and recordings with lutenist Rolf Lislevand and his improv/baroque ensembles. Latest recording on ECM with this ensemble in 2008 "Diminuito".

Honors 
1990: "Jazz Musician of the Year", by The Association of Norwegian jazz musicians
1994: Buddyprisen, by the Norwegian Jazz Forum

Discography (in selection) 

With Knut Riisnæs Quartet
1982: Flukt (Odin Records), with Dag Arnesen & Jon Christensen
With Chet Baker
The Improviser (Cadence Jazz, 1983)
With Terje Rypdal
1985: Chaser (ECM Records), with Terje Rypdal & The Chasers
1987: Blue (ECM Records), with Terje Rypdal & The Chasers
1989: The Singles Collection (ECM Records), with Terje Rypdal & The Chasers
1993: Q.E.D. (ECM Records)
1995: If Mountains Could Sing (ECM Records)
2006: Vossabrygg (ECM Records), commissioned work at Vossajazz 2003

With Jon Eberson
1985: Stories (CBS Records), Jon Eberson Band
1987: Stash (Odin Records), Trio with Audun Kleive
1990: Blow! (Odin Records), with Morten Halle & Finn Sletten
1992: 2 (Curling Legs), with Morten Halle & Finn Sletten
1993: Live At Rockefeller (Odin Records), with Jazzpunkensemblet
1997: Thirteen Rounds (Curling Legs), with "Jazzpunkensemblet"

With Knut Kristiansen
1987: Monk Memorial

With Ab und Zu
1993: Den akustiske skygge

With Dag Arnesen
1989: Renascent (Odin Records), Trio with Svein Christiansen
1990: The day after (Taurus), Quintet with Wenche Gausdal, Odd Riisnæs and Svein Christiansen

With Jan Gunnar Hoff
1991: Syklus (Odin Records)
1995: Moving (Curling Legs)
1996: Crosslands (Curling Legs)

With Ketil Bjørnstad
1993: Water Stories (ECM Records)
2004: Seafarer's Song (Universal Music Norway, EmArcy)
2010: Hvalenes sang (Grappa Music)

With Berit Opheim
1998: Fryd (Curling Legs), with Einar Mjølsnes, Per Jørgensen & Sigbjørn Apeland
2005: Ein Song Frå Dei Utsunge Stunder (Vossajazz Records), with "BNB" (Nils Økland)

With Metropolitan
1999: Metropolitan (Columbia Records)
2004: Love Is Blind (Curling Legs), with strings

With Oslo 13
2001: Live In The North (Curling Legs)

With Kristin Skaare
2008: Var (Grammofon)

With Tore Johansen
2008: Giving (Inner Ear)
2009: Jazz Mass (Inner Ear)

With Geir Lysne Ensemble
2009: The Grieg Code (ACT)

With "Northern Arc"
2012: Northern Arc (Curling Legs)

With Chamber projects
1992: Borealis (Aurora), with "Borealis"
2006: Nuove musiche, with Rolf Lislevand
2009: Diminuito, with Rolf Lislevand

References

External links 
Bjørn Kjellemyr Biografi on Store Norske Leksikon

1950 births
Living people
21st-century Norwegian guitarists
20th-century Norwegian male musicians
21st-century Norwegian male musicians
20th-century Norwegian bass guitarists
21st-century Norwegian bass guitarists
20th-century Norwegian upright-bassists
21st-century Norwegian upright-bassists
Jazz double-bassists
Male double-bassists
Male jazz composers
Norwegian jazz composers
Norwegian male bass guitarists
Norwegian jazz upright-bassists
People from Bamble
Jazzpunkensemblet members
ECM Records artists